Yuliyan Nenov (Bulgarian: Юлиян Ненов; born 17 November 1994) is a Bulgarian professional footballer who currently plays as a winger for Bulgarian First League club Lokomotiv Sofia.

Career
Nenov started his career at CSKA Sofia, joining their youth system in 2003, but failed to break into the first team and joined Chavdar Etropole, Botev Vratsa, Montana and Lokomotiv Gorna Oryahovitsa on loan before making a permanent move to Dunav Ruse in June 2015.

In his first campaign with Dunav Nenov scored 8 league goals, helping the team gain promotion to the First League.

On 31 May 2018, Nenov signed a two-year contract with the new member of the Bulgarian First League Botev Vratsa. After a stint in Morocco, he joined Beroe Stara Zagora as a free agent in May 2019.

Career statistics

Personal life
Nenov was born in Sofia. His father Rumen was also a footballer who played as a goalkeeper.

References

External links

1994 births
Living people
Bulgarian footballers
Bulgaria youth international footballers
Bulgaria under-21 international footballers
First Professional Football League (Bulgaria) players
Second Professional Football League (Bulgaria) players
PFC CSKA Sofia players
FC Chavdar Etropole players
FC Botev Vratsa players
FC Montana players
FC Lokomotiv Gorna Oryahovitsa players
FC Dunav Ruse players
PFC Beroe Stara Zagora players
Association football wingers